Manor of Santa Catarina is a former-manorhouse in the civil parish of São Pedro, in the municipality of Angra do Heroísmo, on the Portuguese island of Terceira, in the Azores. For many years it served as the family seat of the descendants of the Corte-Real, before becoming the official residence of the Bishop of Angra do Heroísmo.

History

The manor served as the primary residence for the Corte-Real family for centuries.

This palace was subject to restoration and maintenance works after the earthquake that occurred on 1 January 1980 quite the damaged.

Currently the palace serves as one of the official residences of the Bishop of Angra do Heroísmo and is property of the diocese, hosting Pope John Paul II during his visit to the Azores.

On 9 September 2004, the spaces were classified under a resolution-in-council of the Azorean government (126/2004), encompassing the former-classification of the property within the city of Angra do Heroísmo (JORAA, Série 1, 15).

Architecture
The manor, of appreciable dimensions, is located in the locality of Pico da Urze, near Portões de São Pedro, just north of the Angra campus of the University of the Azores.

It is recognizable for its massive entrance gate and walled compound, that includes internal arcade constructed of regional stone.

References

Manor Santa Catarina
Santa Catarina